V.M. Petlyakov Design Bureau (Opytnoe Konstructorskoe Byuro Petlyakova) was a Soviet OKB (design bureau) for military aircraft, headed by designer Vladimir Petlyakov. Following his death in 1942, the bureau was controlled by Izakson, Putliov, and Myasishchyev before being dissolved in 1946.

Developments
Pe-2 'Buck'/PB-100, 1939.
VI-100/"100" prototype, "high altitude fighter", 1939.
Pe-2I fighter
Pe-3 multirole fighter, 207  were built, 1941.
Pe-3bis multirole fighter, about 300 were built, 1941.
Pe-4 Pe-2 with Klimov VK-105PF engines.
Vb-109 (by V.Myasichev) high-altitude bomber.
Pe-8/TB-7 The only four-engined bomber the USSR used during World War II, 1935.

References

Aircraft manufacturers of the Soviet Union
Design bureaus